is a railway  station in Waki, Kuga District, Yamaguchi Prefecture, Japan, operated by West Japan Railway Company (JR West).

Lines
Waki Station is served by the Sanyō Main Line.

History
Waki station opened on 15 March 2008.

See also
 List of railway stations in Japan

References

External links

  

Railway stations in Yamaguchi Prefecture
Sanyō Main Line
Railway stations in Japan opened in 2008